The Clarence Aquatic Centre is a major aquatic sporting facility located in Montagu Bay, in the city of Clarence, Tasmania, Australia.

Establishment
The facility originally opened in 1963 as the Clarence War Memorial Pool, an outdoor  pool, with a children's wading pool and a toddler's splash pool. The pool was also surrounded by pleasant gardens. It had a large uncovered grandstand, which was exposed to the elements. Despite the quality of the facility at the time, it had to close for a winter break, due to its uncovered nature.

Bubble
In 1982, it was decided to cover the pool to allow it to operate year-round. Rather than building a permanent roof, the council opted to erect an inflatable canvas and synthetic "bubble", which was to provide protection from weather and allow the pool to operate during the evening. The new "Bubble", as it became affectionately known, proved extremely popular, and it was decided not to lower it during the summer season as previously planned. The large white dome soon became a well known feature of the Eastern Shore landscape, and was clearly visible to motorists as they crossed the Tasman Bridge.

During the 1980s and 1990s, the Clarence Pool was the only indoor Olympic-sized pool in the state and was probably the premier facility for aquatic sports. It hosted the Tasmanian Swimming Championships on several occasions and was home to many other sports, such as water polo, underwater hockey, canoe polo and fin swimming.

Because the bubble was not intended to be permanently inflated, its life expectancy was dramatically reduced, and it famously split a seam during an evening swimming competition whilst its internal grandstands were filled with spectators. No one was injured in the incident, but it closed the pool for a period whilst repairs were made. It was realised towards the end of the 1990s that the bubble was coming to an end of its useful life after nearly 20 years.

Redevelopment
Following the Hobart City Council's redevelopment of their pool into the Hobart Aquatic Centre, the Clarence City Council decided to modernise the Clarence Pool. In 2002, the bubble was finally removed, and in 2003 the facility closed for an 11-month, A$2.8 million refurbishment programme. A modern and energy-efficient permanent building was constructed to replace the bubble, enclosing the 50-m Olympic pool, the children's wading pool, and the toddler's splash pool. New non-slip deck surfacing was laid, and the changing facilities were renovated; new lighting and heating and better disabled access were also included in the renovation.

Reopening
The YMCA was granted a contract for the management of the facility when it re-opened in 2004. They run aquatic education, junior flippa ball, aqua aerobics, adult education, and water safety programmes.

The Clarence Aquatic Centre is also the home pool of the Clarence Crocs Waterpolo Club.

See also
Sport in Tasmania

References

External links
 Clarence Aquatic Centre

Sports venues in Tasmania
City of Clarence
1963 establishments in Australia
Swimming venues in Australia
Water polo venues in Australia